Parizhskaya Kommuna Glacier is a glacier, 8 nautical miles (15 km) long, draining northwest between Zwiesel Mountain and Grakammen Ridge to Humboldt Graben in the Petermann Ranges, Wohlthat Mountains. Discovered and plotted from air photos by German Antarctic Expedition, 1938–39. Mapped from air photos and surveys by Norwegian Antarctic Expedition, 1956–60; remapped by Soviet Antarctic Expedition, 1960–61, and named Lednik Parizhskoy Kommuny (Paris commune glacier).

See also
 List of glaciers in the Antarctic
 Glaciology

References

See also
 List of glaciers in the Antarctic
 Glaciology

Glaciers of Queen Maud Land
Princess Astrid Coast